Manalcus Aycock House is a historic home located at Black Creek, Wilson County, North Carolina.  It was built in 1900, and is a large two-story, six bay, rambling frame dwelling. It consists of a hipped-roof section with two-story cross-gable wings.  It features a large front porch with half-timbering and sawnwork decoration and stained glass windows.  Also on the property is a contributing hipped-roof garage.

It was listed on the National Register of Historic Places in 1986.

References

Houses on the National Register of Historic Places in North Carolina
Houses completed in 1900
Houses in Wilson County, North Carolina
National Register of Historic Places in Wilson County, North Carolina